Chixi may refer to these places in China:

Chixi Subdistrict, Lanxi, Zhejiang
Chixi, Ningde, Fujian
Chixi, Guangdong, in Taishan, Guangdong
Chixi, Sichuan, in Nanjiang County, Sichuan
Chixi, Cangnan County, Zhejiang
Chixi Township, Fujian, in Yongtai County, Fujian
Chixi Township, Jiangxi, in Jinxian County, Jiangxi

See also

Chiki